In the 1941–42 season, USM Blida is competing in the First Division for the 8th season French colonial era, as well as the Forconi Cup. They will be competing in First Division, and the Algiers Cup.

Non-competitive

Pre-season

Friendly

Competitions

Overview

League table

Results summary

Results by round

Matches

Algiers Cup

Players statistics

|-
! colspan=12 style=background:#dcdcdc; text-align:center| Goalkeepers

|-
! colspan=12 style=background:#dcdcdc; text-align:center| Defenders

|-
! colspan=12 style=background:#dcdcdc; text-align:center| Midfielders

|-
! colspan=12 style=background:#dcdcdc; text-align:center| Forwards

|}

References

External links
 L'Echo d'Alger : journal républicain du matin

USM Blida seasons
Algerian football clubs 1941–42 season